Claude Thomas Smith (March 14, 1932 – December 13, 1987) was an American band conductor, composer, and music educator. His compositions include Flight, adopted as the "Official March" of the National Air and Space Museum of the Smithsonian Institution, and Eternal Father, Strong to Save, commissioned in 1975, that premiered at a Kennedy Center celebration of the 50th anniversary of the United States Navy Band.

Biography
Smith was born in Monroe City, Missouri on March 14, 1932. His grandmother, a piano teacher and organist, influenced his interest in music, and he took up the cornet in eighth grade. He learned to conduct in high school and with a local Boy Scout band.

He switched to the horn during his time under director K.K. Anderson at Central Methodist College in Fayette, Missouri. He joined the 371st US Army Band in 1952 during the Korean War. After marrying Maureen Morrison in 1952, he finished his Bachelor of Music Education degree in 1958 at the University of Kansas. He began to compose during his time at KU.

Smith died on December 13, 1987 after conducting a Christmas concert. His wife, Maureen, daughter, Pam Smith Kelly and son-in-law, Jim Kelly, founded Claude T. Smith Publications, Inc. in 1993.

Music educator
Smith worked as a music educator at public schools in Nebraska and Missouri. In 1976, he took a faculty position at Southwest Missouri State University; he conducted the University Symphony Orchestra at that institution. He left in 1978 to move to Raytown, Missouri, where his main occupation was composition. He worked as an educational consultant for Wingert-Jones Publications, who published many of his compositions, and worked as a staff writer for Jenson Publications.

Composer
Claude T. Smith is remembered for his composition work. He completed over 110 compositions for band, 12 orchestral works, and 15 choral pieces. The following excerpt from the finding aid of his collection at the University of Maryland, College Park describes his style:

Smith was a member of ASCAP and the American Bandmasters Association. He was recognized through a resolution from the Missouri House of Representatives in 1976, received the Hall of Fame Award from the Missouri Bandmasters Association in 1988, and was awarded the Distinguished Service to Music Medal from Kappa Kappa Psi in 1989. His composition Flight is the "official march" of the Smithsonian Institution's National Air and Space Museum. Other works, including Eternal Father, Strong to Save; Emperata Overture; Variations on a Hymn by Louis Bourgeois; Incidental Suite; Ballad and Presto Dance: for Solo Tuba; and Variations on a Revolutionary War Hymn are still widely performed.

Sources

External links
Claude T. Smith Collection - Special Collections in Performing Arts at the University of Maryland
Vimeo: Fantasia for Alto Saxophone and Band (Claude T. Smith)
YouTube: Claude T. Smith Fantasia
https://www.barnhouse.com/composer/claude-t-smith/ - Listing of works and biographical info.  Contains links to music scores and recordings

1932 births
1987 deaths
People from Monroe City, Missouri
People from Carroll County, Missouri
People from Livingston County, Missouri
People from Raytown, Missouri
Central Methodist University alumni
University of Kansas alumni
American music educators
American male composers
American male conductors (music)
Distinguished Service to Music Medal recipients
20th-century American conductors (music)
20th-century American composers
20th-century American educators
Schoolteachers from  Missouri
20th-century American male musicians